Tamires Morena Lima de Araújo (born 16 May 1994) is a Brazilian handballer for CS Gloria 2018 Bistrița-Năsăud and the Brazilian national team.

Born into a sporting family, her sister Monique is a Brazilian national champion in weightlifting, who also participated at the 2013 World Weightlifting Championships.

Morena Lima initially began with athletics, but a handball coach noticed her height and strength, and saw potential in her in handball. She eventually chose handball and rose through the ranks quickly.

In 2013, she was part of the Brazilian national team that won the South American Championship and a year later she went triumphant with the junior national team at the 2014 Pan American Women's Junior Handball Championship.

She signed a three-and-a-half year contract with Győri ETO KC in December 2014.

Achievements
Brazilian National Championship:
Winner: 2013
 Pan American Championship:
Winner: 2015
 South American Handball Championship:
Winner: 2013
 Pan American Junior Championship:
Winner: 2014

Awards and recognition
 All-Star Line Player of the Junior Pan American Championship: 2014
 Top scorer of the Junior Pan American Championship: 2014
2021 South and Central American Women's Handball Championship: All star team Pivot

References

External links

 

1994 births
Living people
Brazilian female handball players
Expatriate handball players
Brazilian expatriate sportspeople in France
Brazilian expatriate sportspeople in Hungary
Brazilian expatriate sportspeople in Norway
Brazilian expatriate sportspeople in Romania
Győri Audi ETO KC players
Pan American Games gold medalists for Brazil
Pan American Games medalists in handball
Handball players at the 2016 Summer Olympics
Olympic handball players of Brazil
Handball players at the 2015 Pan American Games
Handball players at the 2019 Pan American Games
Sportspeople from Rio de Janeiro (city)
South American Games gold medalists for Brazil
South American Games medalists in handball
Competitors at the 2018 South American Games
Medalists at the 2015 Pan American Games
Medalists at the 2019 Pan American Games
Handball players at the 2020 Summer Olympics
20th-century Brazilian women
21st-century Brazilian women